Kent Bulle (born September 15, 1988) is an American professional golfer.

Bulle was born in Glasgow, Kentucky. He played college golf at Middle Tennessee State before turning pro in 2010.

In 2015, Bulle won his first PGA Tour Latinoamérica title at the Visa Open de Argentina.

In 2016, Bulle qualified for the U.S. Open by earning medalist honors at his sectional qualifying site; he missed the cut. Bulle also successfully defended his title at the Visa Open de Argentina, which qualified him for the 2017 Open Championship.

Professional wins (3)

PGA Tour Latinoamérica wins (2)

PGA Tour Latinoamérica playoff record (1–2)

Other wins (1)
2015 Kentucky Open

Results in major championships

CUT = missed the half-way cut
"T" = tied for place

References

External links

American male golfers
Middle Tennessee Blue Raiders men's golfers
PGA Tour golfers
Golfers from Kentucky
Golfers from Tennessee
People from Glasgow, Kentucky
Sportspeople from Nashville, Tennessee
1988 births
Living people